Bhoa is a town in Pathankot, Tehsil, in the Pathankot District of Punjab State, India is 13 km from Pathankot.

It is located near the border between Gurdaspur and Kangra Districts. Kangra District Indora is East towards this place. It is also near the border with Kathua district and on the border with both Himachal Pradesh and Jammu and Kashmir.

Demography

The language primarily spoken in Bhoa Village is Punjabi.

Politics
The city is part of the Bhoa Assembly Constituency.

Education

Colleges near Bhoa
M.g.n. College Jakholari Pathankot
Sri Sai College Of Engineering & Technology,
Aman Bhalla Institute Of Engg & Tech.

Schools 
Gsss Bhoa

References

External links
Punjab.gov.in
Punjabtourism.gov.in 

Villages in Pathankot district